Dhritarashtra is a poetry book by Ghanshyam Kandel. It was published in 2016 by Airawati Prakashan. It is a short epic in verse and retells the story of the Mahabharat through the eyes of the blind king of Hastinapur, Dhritarashtra. It won the prestigious Madan Puraskar, 2073 B.S.

It is an epic poem and the author's sixth book. Reimagining of the Mahabharata, Dhritarastra retells the epic from the blind king’s perspective, undercutting deeply entrenched notions of what is right and wrong and what is just and unjust.

Synopsis 
Dhritarashtra is told from the viewpoint of Dhritarashtra the blind king and focuses on how he perceives the protagonists of the Mahabharat war. Original Mahabharat depicts Krishna as a charismatic leader who fights for truth and justice. But in Kandel’s verse, Krishna appears as a crafty conspirator who tricks others into fighting the brutal war at Kurukshetra and plots the murder of Duryodhan and Dronacharya.

Reception 
The book won the prestigious Madan Puraskar, 2073 BS (2016).

See also 

 Muna Madan
 Gauri
Naya Ishwar Ko Ghoshana
 Tarun Tapasi

References 

Mahabharata
Epic poems
Nepalese poems
Madan Puraskar-winning works
Nepalese books
2016 poetry books
21st-century Nepalese books
Nepalese epics
Epic poems in Nepali
Poems based on the Mahabharata